William H. Grant House may refer to:

William H. Grant House (Middleport, Ohio)
William H. Grant House (Richmond, Virginia)

See also
Grant House (disambiguation)